Catholicos Moses III (also Movses III) of Tatev was the Catholicos of the Armenian Apostolic Church between 1629 and 1632.

He was a pioneer of the reform movement within the church and his work was carried on by his successors. He also obtained protection from the Shah of Persia against local Muslim chieftains.

Catholicoi of Armenia
1632 deaths
Armenian Oriental Orthodox Christians
Year of birth unknown
17th-century people of Safavid Iran